Eruptive pseudoangiomatosis is a cutaneous condition characterized by the sudden appearance of 2- to 4-mm blanchable red papules.

It can appear in children or adults. The papules appear similar to hemangiomas

Viruses found in patients include Echovirus 25 and 32, coxsackie B, Epstein–Barr virus, and cytomegalovirus.

See also 
 Boston exanthem disease
 Skin lesion

References 

Virus-related cutaneous conditions